Supplemental Punctuation is a Unicode block containing historic and specialized punctuation characters, including biblical editorial symbols, ancient Greek punctuation, and German dictionary marks.

Additional punctuation characters are in the General Punctuation block and sprinkled in dozens of other Unicode blocks.

Block

History
The following Unicode-related documents record the purpose and process of defining specific characters in the Supplemental Punctuation block:

See also 
 Unicode symbols

References 

Unicode blocks